Coreobagrus is a genus of bagrid catfishes found in Eastern Asia.

Species
There are currently two described species in this genus:
 Coreobagrus brevicorpus T. Mori, 1936 (Korean stumpy bullhead)
 Coreobagrus ichikawai Okada & Kubota, 1957 (Neko-gigi)

References
 

Bagridae
Catfish genera
Freshwater fish genera
Taxa named by Tamezo Mori